Maryanne Kowaleski, FRHistS, is a medieval historian, who was Joseph Fitzpatrick S. J. Distinguished Professor of History and Medieval Studies at Fordham University from 2005 until her retirement.

Career 
Kowaleski completed her undergraduate studies at the University of Michigan, graduating with an AB in 1974 with a double major in French and Medieval/Renaissance studies. She then completed a Master of Arts degree in medieval studies at the University of Toronto in 1976, before completing the Medieval Studies Licentiate in 1978 at the Pontifical Institute of Medieval Studies at Toronto, before spending the 1978–79 academic year as a Fulbright Scholar at the University of Exeter in the United Kingdom. She returned to the University of Toronto to carry out her doctoral studies; her PhD was awarded in 1982. Kowaleski's first academic appointment came in 1982, when she joined the History Department at Fordham University as an assistant professor; six years later she was promoted to associate professor, and then to full professor in 1996 (in which position she remained until taking up the distinguished professorship in 2005).

Honours 
Kowaleski was elected a Fellow of the Royal Historical Society in 1994 and a Fellow of the Medieval Academy of America in 2005 (the latter of which she was President for the 2012–13 year).

Selected works 
 (Co-edited with John Langdon and Phillipp Schofield) Peasants and Lords in the Medieval English Economy: Essays in Honour of Bruce M. S. Campbell (Brepols, 2015).
 (Co-edited with P. J. P. Goldberg) Medieval Domesticity: Home, Housing and Household in Medieval England (Cambridge University Press, 2009).
 (Edited and translated) Medieval Towns: A Reader (Broadview Press, 2006).
 (Co-edited with Mary Erler) Gendering the Master Narrative: Women and Power in the Middle Ages (Cornell University Press, 2003).
 The Havener's Accounts of the Earldom and Duchy of Cornwall, 1287–1356, Devon and Cornwall Record Society, New Series, no. 44 (2001).
 Local Markets and Regional Trade in Medieval Exeter (Cambridge University Press, 1995).
 The Local Customs Accounts of the Port of Exeter, 1266–1321, Devon and Cornwall Record Society, New Series, no. 36 (1993).
 (Co-edited with Mary Erler) Women and Power in the Middle Ages (University of Georgia Press, 1988).

References 

Living people
University of Michigan College of Literature, Science, and the Arts alumni
University of Toronto alumni
Fordham University faculty
Fellows of the Royal Historical Society
American women historians
Fellows of the Medieval Academy of America
20th-century American historians
20th-century American women writers
21st-century American historians
21st-century American women writers
American medievalists
Women medievalists
British women historians
Year of birth missing (living people)